University Park may refer to:

In the United States:
University Park, Los Angeles, California, home of the University of Southern California
University Park, Florida, in Miami-Dade County, home of Florida International University
University, Orange County, Florida (sometimes shown as "University Park"), a neighbor of the University of Central Florida
University Park, Illinois, home of Governors State University
University Park (Indianapolis, Indiana), on the National Register of Historic Places
University Park, Iowa, home of Vennard College
University Park, James Madison University
University Park, Maryland, a town neighboring College Park (home of the University of Maryland, College Park)
University Park at MIT, Cambridge, Massachusetts
University Park, New Mexico, a suburb of Las Cruces (home of New Mexico State University)
University Park (Grand Forks, North Dakota), one of Grand Forks, North Dakota's parks 
University Park, Pennsylvania, home of Pennsylvania State University
University Park Airport, regional airport serving Penn State University
University Park, Portland, Oregon, a neighborhood in Portland
University Park, Texas, home of Southern Methodist University
University Park (Worcester, Massachusetts), a public park close to Clark University
University of Houston (formerly University of Houston–University Park)

In England:
University Park Campus, Nottingham, a University of Nottingham campus
University Parks, a large parkland area near Oxford

In Scotland:
University Park, St Andrews, home of University of St Andrews RFC

In Denmark:
 University Park, Aarhus, a park
 University Park (University of Copenhagen), a part of the University of Copenhagen's North Campus

In Peru:
 University Park, Lima, a park located in central Lima

See also
 College Park (disambiguation)
University Park Historic District (disambiguation)